The Lütschine is a river in the Bernese Oberland region of Switzerland. The Lütschine proper runs from Zweilütschinen, where its two tribututaries join, to Lake Brienz at Bönigen. The Schwarze Lütschine, or Black Lütschine, flows from Grindelwald to Zweilütschinen. The Weisse Lütschine, or White Lütschine, flows from the Lauterbrunnen Valley to Zweilütschinen.

Both branches of the Lütschine include a large number of mountain streams as tributaries. A notable tributary of the Schwarze Lütschine, emerging from the gorge of the Lower Grindelwald Glacier, is confusingly referred to as "Weisse Lütschine". The highest point of the drainage basin is the Jungfrau.

A story passed on by word of mouth showing friendly banter between villagers that lived on the two rivers is that the people on the Weisse Lütschine said the others "were so dirty it turned the river black" and the villagers on the Schwarze Lütschine claimed the others "never even washed so the other tributary remained perfectly white".

A modern observer standing at Zweilütschinen in winter might note that during the day the Schwarze Lütschine valley to the east is dark, shaded and cold, whereas the south facing Weisse Lütschine valley to the south (the Lauterbrunnen Valley) is sunny and light.

From Wilderswil to Lauterbrunnen and Grindelwald, the banks of the Lütschine are closely followed by the tracks of the Berner Oberland Railway.

References 

Rivers of Switzerland
Rivers of the canton of Bern
Rivers of the Alps